The Namaacha Wind Power Station, is a  wind-powered electricity power station under construction in Mozambique. It is the first grid-ready wind energy infrastructure in the country. It is under development by EleQtra Mozambique Limited, a subsidiary of the American independent power producer, EleQtra. The power station will be developed in two phases of 60 megawatts each. The estimated construction budget is US$280 million (approx. €234 million). The energy generated here will be sold directly to Electricidade de Moçambique, the Mozambican electric utility company, under a long-term power purchase agreement.

Location
The power station is located near the town of Namaacha, in Namaacha District, in Maputo Province, in the southwestern part of the country, adjacent to the international border with Eswatini.

Overview
In 2018, the Mozambican Energy Fund (FUNAE), awarded the development rights of this power station to EleQtra. The power station is the first large-scale grid-ready wind farm in the country. The energy generated at this wind farm will be relayed via high voltage transmission wires to an EDM substation at Boane, Mozambique, where the energy will be absorbed into the national electricity grid.

Construction and financing 
The estimated US$280 million construction bill will be met by EleQtra. The United States Trade and Development Agency (USTDA), granted funding to EleQtra to finance a feasibility study for this wind farm.

Construction started in late 2020 and is expected to conclude in late 2023. Construction is expected to create an estimated 700 jobs, the majority of them Mozambican.

See also 

List of power stations in Mozambique

References

External links 
 Approximate Location of Namaacha Wind Power Station

Wind farms in Mozambique
Maputo Province